= Khetla Khedi =

- village
- Location within Madhya Pradesh Location within India
- Coordinates: 23.2510139°N 77.2484181°E
- Country: India
- State: Madhya Pradesh
- District: Bhopal
- Tehsil: Huzur
- Elevation: 519 m (1,703 ft)

Population (2011)
  - Total: 140
- Time zone: UTC+5:30 (IST)
- ISO 3166 code: MP-IN
- 2011 census code: 482479

Khetla Khedi is a village in the Bhopal district of Madhya Pradesh, India. It is located in the Huzur tehsil and the Phanda block.

== Demographics ==
According to the 2011 census of India, Khetla Khedi has 33 households. The effective literacy rate (i.e. the literacy rate of population excluding children aged 6 and below) is 78.57%.

Demographics (2011 Census)
	Total	Male	Female
Population	140	74	66
Children aged below 6 years	14	9	5
Scheduled caste	16	9	7
Scheduled tribe	0	0	0
Literates	99	56	43
Workers (all)	55	36	19
Main workers (total)	55	36	19
Main workers: Cultivators	18	16	2
Main workers: Agricultural labourers	26	10	16
Main workers: Household industry workers	0	0	0
Main workers: Other	11	10	1
Marginal workers (total)	0	0	0
Marginal workers: Cultivators	0	0	0
Marginal workers: Agricultural labourers	0	0	0
Marginal workers: Household industry workers	0	0	0
Marginal workers: Others	0	0	0
Non-workers	85	38	47
